Lučina is a municipality and village in Frýdek-Místek District in the Moravian-Silesian Region of the Czech Republic. It has about 1,500 inhabitants.

Geography
Lučina lies in the historical region of Cieszyn Silesia, in the Moravian-Silesian Foothills. The village is located on the western shore of Žermanice Dam, which is entirely located in the municipal territory of Lučina.

History
The construction of Žermanice Dam on the Lučina River necessitated resettlement of the population of the villages of Dolní Domaslavice and Soběšovice, which were going to be partly flooded. Therefore, a new village was founded on the western bank of the nascent reservoir to accommodate resettled population, encompassing former western territories of the aforementioned municipalities. The Lučina municipality was officially established on 8 January 1956.

References

External links

 

Villages in Frýdek-Místek District
Cieszyn Silesia